"Keep Searchin' (We'll Follow the Sun)" is a song written by the American rock-and-roll musician Del Shannon. It was written, recorded, and released in 1964. The song is in the key of A minor. Its lyrics tell the story of a man who tries to find a place to hide himself and his beleaguered girlfriend from those who abuse her. The song ends with a sequence of very high notes.

The B-side of "Keep Searchin'" was "Broken Promises." Both songs were recorded in October 1964, along with two other Shannon songs: "Stranger in Town" and "Over You." All four songs were written by Shannon himself.

Chart performance
Shannon's final Top Ten hit, "Keep Searchin'" spent 14 weeks on the Billboard Hot 100 chart, peaking at No. 9, while reaching No. 3 on the UK's Record Retailer chart, No. 6 on the Irish Singles Chart, No. 6 on Norway's VG-lista, No. 14 on Canada's RPM "Top 40 & 5", No. 2 on Sweden's Kvällstoppen, and No. 17 in Germany.

References

1964 songs
1964 singles
Del Shannon songs
Songs written by Del Shannon